Richard Coates (born 16 April 1949, in Grimsby, Lincolnshire, and educated at Wintringham School) is an English linguist. He was Professor of Linguistics (alternatively Professor of Onomastics) at the University of the West of England, Bristol, now emeritus. From 1977 to 2006 he taught at the University of Sussex, where he served as Professor of Linguistics (1991–2006) and as Dean of the School of Cognitive and Computing Sciences (1998–2003). From 1980 to 1989 he was assistant secretary and then secretary of the Linguistics Association of Great Britain. He was honorary director of the Survey of English Place-Names from 2003 to 2019, having previously (1997–2002) served as president of the English Place-Name Society which conducts the Survey, resuming this role in 2019. From 2002 to 2008, he was secretary of the International Council of Onomastic Sciences, a body devoted to the promotion of the study of names, and elected as one of its two vice-presidents from 2011 to 2017. He was elected a fellow of the Society of Antiquaries in 1992 and of the Royal Society of Arts in 2001.

His main academic interests are proper names (both from the historical and the theoretical perspective), historical linguistics in general, the philology of the Germanic, Romance and Celtic languages, regional variation in language, and local history. He is editor of the Survey of English Place-Names for Hampshire and was principal investigator of the AHRC-funded project Family Names of the United Kingdom (FaNUK), running from 2010 to 2016, of which Patrick Hanks was lead researcher.

He has written books on the names of the Channel Islands, the local place-names of St Kilda, Hampshire and Sussex, the dialect of Sussex, and, with Andrew Breeze, on Celtic place-names in England, as well as over 500 academic articles, notes, and collections on related topics. His main contribution to linguistic theory is The Pragmatic Theory of Properhood, set out in a number of articles since 2000.

He is also the author of Word Structure, a students' introduction to linguistic morphology (Routledge), and of online resources on Shakespeare's character-names and on the place-names of Hayling Island.

See also

 Etymology of London

Books, dissertations and selected other freestanding publications

1977 The status of rules in historical phonology. Doctoral dissertation 10301, University of Cambridge. [Unpublished.]

1987  (co-ed. with John Lyons, Margaret Deuchar and Gerald Gazdar) New horizons in linguistics 2. Harmondsworth: Pelican; pp. viii + 465.

1988  Toponymic topics: essays on the early toponymy of the British Isles. Brighton: Younsmere Press; pp. v + 124.

1989  The place-names of Hampshire. London: Batsford; pp. vii + 193.

1990  The place-names of St Kilda: nomina hirtensia. Lewiston, New York: Edwin Mellen Press ( Celtic Studies 1); pp. viii + 221.

1991  The ancient and modern names of the Channel Islands: a linguistic history. Stamford: Paul Watkins; pp. xiv + 144.

1992  (ed.) De A.B.C. psalms by Jim Cladpole (James Richards). Brighton: Younsmere Press; pp. 46.

1993  Hampshire place-names. Southampton: Ensign Publications. Paperback edition of The place-names of Hampshire; pp. 193.

1996–2007 (ed.) Locus focus: forum of the Sussex place-names net (7 vols, 14 issues).

1999  The place-names of West Thorney. Nottingham: English Place-Name Society (supplementary series 1); pp. v + 64.

1999  Word structure. London and New York: Routledge (Routledge Language Workbooks); pp. ix + 101. [Student guide to morphology. Also available as an e-book from 2005.]

2000 (with Andrew Breeze; including a contribution by David Horovitz) Celtic voices, English places: studies of the Celtic impact on place-names in England. Stamford: Shaun Tyas; pp. xiv + 433.

2006 (guest ed.) Name theory. Special issue of Onoma, vol. 41 (spine date 2006; appeared 2011); pp. 309 (eISSN 1783-1644).

2007  The place-names of Hayling Island, Hampshire. [MS. of 1991. Web-publication; http://www.uwe.ac.uk/hlss/llas/staff_coates_r_hayling.doc; pp. 96.]

2010  A place-name history of the parishes of Rottingdean and Ovingdean in Sussex (including Woodingdean and Saltdean). Nottingham: English Place-Name Society (Regional series 2); pp. xviii + 222, . [Published with the aid of a grant from the British Academy.]

2010  The traditional dialect of Sussex: a history, description, selected texts, bibliography and discography. Lewes: Pomegranate Press; pp. 349. (.) [Published with the aid of a grant from the Marc Fitch Fund.]

2016 (co-ed. with Patrick Hanks and Peter McClure) The Oxford dictionary of family names in the United Kingdom. Oxford: Oxford University Press. (also ebook and online versions.)

2017 Wilkins of Westbury and Redland: the life and writings of the Rev. Dr Henry John Wilkins (1865-1941). Bristol: Avon Local History Association pamphlet 24.

2017 Your city's place-names: Brighton and Hove. Nottingham: English Place-Name Society. (.)
 
2017 Your city's place-names: Bristol. Nottingham: English Place-Name Society. (.)

2018  (guest ed. with Katalin Reszegi) Onomastica Uralica 11. (.)

2019 Places, names and history in north-west Bristol: Shirehampton, Avonmouth and King’s Weston. Bristol: Bristol Centre for Linguistics, University of the West of England.

2019 Your city's place-names: Cambridge. Nottingham: English Place-Name Society.

2020 (co-ed. with Luisa Caiazzo and Maoz Azaryahu) Naming, identity and tourism. Newcastle: Cambridge Scholars Publishing. (.)

2020 (guest co-ed. with Martyna Gibka) Explorations in literary onomastic theory. Special issue of Onoma, vol. 53 (spine date 2018; to appear 2020).

External links
, University of the West of England: Richard Coates, where a list of his main recent publications can be found.

References

Living people
Academics of the University of the West of England, Bristol
Academics of the University of Sussex
1949 births
Toponymists
English toponymy
Linguists from England
20th-century linguists
21st-century linguists
Fellows of the Society of Antiquaries of London